Mansewood is an unincorporated community in Halton Hills, Ontario, Canada.

Middle Sixteen Mile Creek flows through the settlement.

The early settlement was part of The Scotch Block, a large agricultural area in Esquesing Township occupied primarily by Scottish immigrants.

History
A cemetery is located west of the settlement and contains a grave dating to 1815.

Mansewood had a post office from 1877 to 1914.

In 1889, Owen Robertson, a farmer from Mansewood, was noted for the exceptional growth of his Prize Cluster Oats, an experimental variety.  Robertson produced  of oats from just  of seed.

References

Neighbourhoods in Halton Hills